Albert J. Henry Jr. (born February 9, 1949), is a retired center who played in the National Basketball Association. He was drafted in the first round of the 1970 NBA Draft by the Philadelphia 76ers and would play two seasons with the team.

References

1949 births
Living people
American men's basketball players
Basketball players from Memphis, Tennessee
Centers (basketball)
Hamden Bics players
Lancaster Red Roses (CBA) players
Philadelphia 76ers players
Philadelphia 76ers draft picks
Wilkes-Barre Barons players
Wisconsin Badgers men's basketball players